Solos is a 2007 Singaporean drama film directed by Kan Lume and Loo Zihan, written by Loo, and starring Lim Yu-Beng, Loo, and Goh Guat Kian.  It is based on a short film by Kan and Loo.  The film features no dialogue and recounts the relationships between a boy (Loo), his mother (Goh), and his older lover (Lim).  It premiered at the Busan International Film Festival after being pulled from the Singapore International Film Festival when the Singaporean government demanded cuts.

Plot 
A boy carries on an illicit affair with his schoolteacher while becoming more distanced from his mother.  As the boy and his older lover also become more distanced over time, the boy breaks off the relationship, and his lover becomes distraught.

Cast 
 Lim Yu-Beng as Man
 Loo Zihan as Boy
 Goh Guat Kian as Mother

Production 
The film was loosely based on co-director Loo's experiences.  Loo had been in a relationship with an older man while he was a teenager.  The relationship ended after Loo grew in a direction different his lover.  Loo said that Singapore's anti-gay laws were not a major concern during filming, as other illegal behavior is regularly depicted in film.  It is based on Untitled, a short film by Loo and Kan.

Release 
Solos was intended to premiere at the Singapore International Film Festival.  After the Singaporean government cut the film, it was pulled from competition and given a jury-only screening.  It premiered instead at the Busan International Film Festival.

Reception 
Robert Koehler of Variety wrote, "The film's achievement lies in its ability to imply complex entanglements and shifting emotional states without a shred of language."  Maggie Lee of The Hollywood Reporter compared it to a student film that overuses technique.  Twitch Film called it "a worthy addition" to Singapore's cinema.

References

External links 
 

2007 films
2007 drama films
2007 independent films
2007 LGBT-related films
Singaporean independent films
Singaporean LGBT-related films
Silent films in color
LGBT-related coming-of-age films
LGBT-related drama films
LGBT-related films based on actual events
LGBT-related controversies in film
Obscenity controversies in film